Tripartite synapse refers to the functional integration and physical proximity of the presynaptic membrane, postsynaptic membrane, and their intimate association with surrounding glia as well as the combined contributions of these three synaptic components to the production of activity at the chemical synapse. Tripartite synapses occur at a number of locations in the central nervous system with astrocytes and may also exist with Muller glia of retinal ganglion cells and Schwann cells at the neuromuscular junction. The term was first introduced in the late 1990s to account for a growing body of evidence that glia are not merely passive neuronal support cells but, instead, play an active role in the integration of synaptic information through bidirectional communication with the neuronal components of the synapse as mediated by neurotransmitters and gliotransmitters.

Evidence of the Tripartite Synapse 

Evidence for the role of astrocytes in the integration and processing of synaptic integration presents itself in a number of ways:
Astrocytes are excitable cells: In response to stimuli from any of the three components of the tripartite synapse, astrocytes are capable of producing transient changes in their intracellular calcium concentrations through release of calcium stores from the endoplasmic reticulum
Astrocytes communicate bidirectionally with neurons: Through changes in their calcium concentration excitability, astrocytes are able to detect neurotransmitters and other signals released from neurons at the synapse and can release their own neurotransmitters or gliotransmitters that are, in turn, capable of modifying the electrophysiological excitability of neurons.
Astrocytes are capable of responding selectively to stimuli: Astrocytes of the hippocampal stratum oriens form tripartite synapses with axonal projections from the alveus. The alveus projections can form either glutamatergic or cholinergic synapses with the stratum oriens, but the astrocytes of this region respond with changes in calcium concentration only to cholinergic activation of alveus projections. This is not merely due to a sensitivity of these astrocytes exclusive to acetylcholine, as they will also respond to glutamatergic synaptic activity originating from a different brain region, the Schaffer collateral.
Astrocytes integrate and modulate information from their synaptic inputs: Astrocytic calcium concentration changes in response to simultaneous stimulation by two neurotransmitter types is not always a linear summation (a linear summation being an increase in intracellular calcium concentration in the astrocyte in response to two simultaneous stimuli that would be the equivalent of adding the calcium concentration changes that would occur in response to each stimulation individually) of the effects of each individual input but varies by the transmitter combinations as well as frequency of stimulation. The hippocampal stratum oriens astrocytes, which respond to synaptic activity from glutamatergic neurons originating in the Schaffer collateral and cholinergic neurons originating in the alveus, produce changes in their intracellular calcium concentrations that is non-linear with the strength of synaptic input. Additionally, these same stimuli are capable of producing either a potentiated calcium concentration response at low frequencies of stimulation or a depressed calcium concentration response at high frequencies of stimulation.

References

Neural synapse